Yechiel is a Hebrew masculine given name meaning "May God live" or "God shall live". 

Several people in the Bible have this name. See Jehiel (biblical figure).

Alternative spellings of Yechiel include Jehiel, Yehiel, Yechi'el, and Yiddish variants include Ichel, Ychel, Echiel, Cheil, and  Chil may refer to:

People
Yehiel Bar (born 1975), Israeli politician
Jehiel Brooks (1797–1886), American soldier and politician
Yehiel De-Nur (1909–2001), Israeli writer
Yehiel Dresner (1922–1947), Israeli paramilitary fighter
Yechiel Eckstein (1951–2019), American rabbi 
Yechiel Fishel Eisenbach (1925–2008), Israeli rabbi
Jehiel R. Elyachar (1898–1989), American engineer
Yechiel Michel Epstein (1829–1908), Lithuanian rabbi
Yehiel Lasri (born 1957), Israeli politician and mayor 
Yechiel Leiter (born 1959), Israeli political scientist and civic leader
Yechiel Lerer (1910–1943), Polish poet
Yehiel Rabinowitz (born 1939), French artist 
Yechiel Shemi (1922–2003), Israeli sculptor
Yehiel Tzagai (born 1983), Israeli football player

References
 The origin and meaning of common Jewish names at Aish.com
 Yechiel/Jehiel at Christian Answers

Hebrew-language names
Hebrew masculine given names
Jewish masculine given names